Jin County or Jinxian may refer to:

Jinzhou, Hebei, formerly Jin County (晋县)
Jinzhou District, Dalian, Liaoning, formerly Jin County (金县)
Linghai, Liaoning, formerly Jin County (锦县)

See also
Jing County (disambiguation)
Jinxian County